Numaligarh Refinery Township is a census town in Golaghat district in the Indian state of Assam.

As of 2001 India census[1], Numaligarh Refinery Township had a population of 1,500. Males constitute 52% of the population and females 48%. Numaligarh Refinery Township has an average literacy rate of 100%,  and female literacy is 100%. In Numaligarh Refinery Township, 16% of the population is under six years of age.

Numaligarh Refinery Limited,  known as "Assam Accord Refinery", has established a Butterfly ecosystem in the vicinity of its township.  The Butterfly valley is spread over  land surrounded by small hillocks, near the Deopahar hills. The township also is home to the popular Delhi Public School, Numaligarh which rose to prominence under its Principals who came in from the Doon School, Dehradun, Anton Siromani and later Winston Gomez, who brought in progressive pedagogy to the school.

References 

Cities and towns in Golaghat district
Townships in India